The 2006 Prime Minister's Cup was the third national football cup competition in Laos. The competition was won by Lao-American College FC who beat Lao Army FC 3-1 in the final. This was the first time the tournament had been held in two years as the 2004 edition was cancelled due to a clash with both the Laotian National Games and the 2005 Southeast Asian Games.

Participants
Four teams qualified from the 2006 Lao League as a result of finishing in the top four places. A further four teams participated from provincial teams. It is unclear whether the provincial teams went through a qualification process similar to that undertaken in the 2003 Prime Minister's Cup.

Lao League teams 
 MCTPC FC (Ministry of Communication, Transportation and Construction)
 Lao-American College FC
 Lao Army FC
 Vientiane FC

Provincial teams 
 Savannakhet FC
 Champasak FC
 Bokeo FC
 Luang Prabang FC

Results
It is not known whether there was a provincial qualifying tournament, nor are any of the group results (nor indeed the format of the initial stages of the competition) known. The following results however, are known:

Third place playoff

Final

References

2006 domestic association football cups
Football competitions in Laos
Lao Premier League
Prime Minister's Cup